Zhang Zhixin (5 December 1930 – 4 April 1975) was a dissident during the Cultural Revolution who became famous for criticizing the idolization of Mao Zedong and the ultra-left. She was imprisoned for six years (1969 to 1975) and tortured, then executed, for having opposing views while being a member of the Chinese Communist Party.
A second party member who had expressed agreement with Zhang was sentenced to 18 years in prison.

Although many consider her a heroine among the people for standing up to the party, her experience is also a reminder of the potential punishment for deviating from party principles.

She did not consider herself anti-communist, but rather a "true Marxist" for whom Mao had distorted the communist cause. Even in prison, she insisted she was a member of the Chinese Communist Party. Many of her points of view were similar to those of the Communist leaders who succeeded Mao. For this reason, she was rehabilitated by Hu Yaobang and recognized as a revolutionary martyr, a model communist.

Early life
Zhang Zhixin was born in Tianjin in 1930. She was educated at Renmin University of China from 1951 to 1952 and later worked in the university. Zhang later became a member of the Communist Party Propaganda Department at Liaoning province.

Zhang expressed her view:

Imprisonment and torture
In 1969, Zhang was imprisoned in by the Liaoning Provincial Party Committee her critical comments toward Mao. She saved up 2 yuan a month to purchase books to read in the facility, where she wrote her study notes on toilet paper. The prison guards then took her pen away. She proclaimed that the party would be "punished by history; if not sooner, then later". For a year and a half she was frequently shackled in leg irons and tied in a harness.

The party forced her to sign divorce papers. Confined in an all-male prison, she was raped and tortured. Other male prisoners were told they could reduce their sentences if they were willing to torture Zhang.

In a prison political-education meeting called to criticize Lin Biao, she shouted that Mao should be responsible for what Lin did. A party secretary from Liaoning Province urged that she be executed quickly. During the Cultural Revolution, most legal procedures were abolished: without judges or trials, cases were decided by various levels of the Revolutionary Committees and Communist Party committees.

Death and posthumous rehabilitation
Zhang was paraded and executed on 4 April 1975, close to the end of the Cultural Revolution. It is reported that her larynx was slit before the execution, in order to prevent her from speaking.

On October 16, 1978, the Intermediate People's Court of Yingkou City, Liaoning Province, revoked the original judgment and acquitted Zhang Zhixin. Four years after her execution, in the spring of 1979 she was officially proclaimed a 'martyr'; 4 April 1979 was designated the day of her memorial. Although an investigation was begun into her case, however party leader Hu Yaobang had it stopped.

Memorial
In People's Park in central Guangzhou, a statue named Mengshi (The Brave) has been raised to commemorate Zhang Zhixin. The statue depicts a nude female warrior shooting an arrow on horseback, and the inscription on its pedestal reads "dedicated to people who struggle for truth".

See also
Censorship in the People's Republic of China
Jonathan Chaves, "A Devout Prayer of the Passion of Chang Chih-hsin," Modern Chinese Literature Newsletter, Vol. 6, No. 1 (Spring 1980), pp. 8–24.

References

1930 births
1975 deaths
Renmin University of China alumni
Chinese dissidents
Chinese torture victims
People executed by China by firearm
People persecuted to death during the Cultural Revolution
Prisoners and detainees of China
Executed People's Republic of China people
Executed people from Tianjin
20th-century executions by China
Executed Chinese women